Gnadenhuetten, alternatively known as New Gnadenhuetten to distinguish from other settlements with similar names, was a Moravian Church mission located in present-day Clinton Township, Macomb County, Michigan, then part of the British Province of Quebec. It was established in 1782 by Rev. David Zeisberg for Lenape who had relocated to the area from Ohio after the Gnadenhutten massacre there. It was closed in 1786 after being threatened by the Chippewa. Moravian Road now runs through the general area where the mission was.

Sources
Walter Romig, Michigan Place Names, p. 226-227.

1782 establishments in the British Empire
Province of Quebec (1763–1791)
Macomb County, Michigan
Lenape
1786 disestablishments in the United States
Moravian Church in the United States